Jérôme Garcès (born 24 October 1973, in Pau) is a French rugby union referee who regularly officiates high-profile club matches in tournaments such as Pro14, Top 14 and the Heineken Cup.

He made his first full international appearance in 2010,  by refereeing the 2009 Junior World Championship in Japan. His debut was between England and Barbarians in the 2010 mid-year tests. During the 2010 end-of-year tests he was touch judge for the Ireland v Samoa match, one of his high-profile appointments of the year. During the 2014 Autumn Internationals Garces took charge of the Cook Cup match between Australia and England at Twickenham. Garces won notable praise from both coaches due to the high level of fitness he showed in the match.

Garcès was also touch judge in the annual Calcutta Cup match between Scotland and England during the 2011 Six Nations. In the 58th minute he became match referee, after the original referee, Romain Poite, was injured during play.

In April 2011, Garcès was named as an assistant referee for the 2011 Rugby World Cup, and served as touch judge for four matches – Ireland v Russia, Fiji v Namibia, Samoa v Namibia and Wales v Namibia.

Garcès took charge of the England v Italy match in the 2012 Six Nations Championship. He also refereed matches between British & Irish Lions and club teams during the 2013 Lions tour to Australia.

In 2015 he refereed Japan's victory over South Africa at Brighton's Falmer Stadium during that year's World Cup tournament. He later refereed his first world cup semi-final when he took charge of the New Zealand vs South Africa game.

In 2017, he refereed a tour match and the second test of the Lions Tour to New Zealand.

In 2019, he was one of the referees at the 2019 Rugby World Cup and also became the first French referee to take charge of the final.

References
This article incorporates information from the French Wikipedia.

1973 births
Living people
French rugby union referees
Sportspeople from Pau, Pyrénées-Atlantiques
Rugby World Cup referees
Six Nations Championship referees
European Rugby Champions Cup referees
The Rugby Championship referees
1872 Cup referees